Dolichamphilius is a genus of loach catfishes endemic to the Democratic Republic of the Congo. There are currently two recognized species in this genus.

Species 
 Dolichamphilius brieni (Poll, 1959)
 Dolichamphilius longiceps T. R. Roberts, 2003

References 

Amphiliidae
Catfish genera

 
Taxa named by Tyson R. Roberts
Freshwater fish genera